Almayer's Folly is a 2011 drama film directed by Chantal Akerman and starring Stanislas Merhar, Aurora Marion and Marc Barbé. It is an adaptation of Joseph Conrad's 1895 debut novel Almayer's Folly, and tells the story of a Dutchman searching for pirate treasure in Malaysia. The setting has been relocated to 1950s. The film was a coproduction between companies in France and Belgium. It received four Magritte Award nominations.

Cast
 Stanislas Merhar as Almayer
 Marc Barbé as Captain Lingard
 Aurora Marion as Nina
 Zac Andrianasolo as Daïn
 Sakhna Oum as Zahira
 Solida Chan as Chen
 Yucheng Sun as Captain Tom Li
 Bunthang Khim as Ali

Production
The film was initially under development for Akerman's Belgian company Paradise Films together with Paulo Branco's Alfama Films for a budget of 3,475,000 euro, with a filming start date set to March 2011. Production was eventually led by Patrick Quinet of France's Liaison Cinématographique together with Paradise Films and Artémis Productions. The project received 350,000 euro in advance from the French National Center of Cinematography and 465,000 euro from the Belgian French Community Film and Audiovisual Centre. In addition it was supported through pre-sales investment by Canal+ and CinéCinéma.

Principal photography took place in Cambodia. Filming started 10 November and ended 24 December 2010.

Reception
The film received critical acclaim from film critics. Review aggregator Rotten Tomatoes reports that 100% out of 8 professional critics gave the film a positive review, with a rating average of 9.3/10.

References

External links
 Official website 
 
 
 

2011 films
2010s French-language films
2010s English-language films
Belgian drama films
French drama films
2011 drama films
Films based on British novels
Films based on works by Joseph Conrad
Films directed by Chantal Akerman
Films produced by Paulo Branco
Films set in Malaysia
Films set in the 1950s
2010s French films